Cacsius is a genus of beetles in the family Cerambycidae, containing the following species:

 Cacsius divus (Melzer, 1932)
 Cacsius nobilis Lane, 1973

References

Aerenicini